The 1902 Ulster Senior Hurling Championship was the second edition of the annual Ulster Senior Hurling Championship held under the auspices of the Ulster GAA. The Championship consisted of a single match between Antrim and Derry, the only entrants.

Antrim were two-time defending Ulster Champions.

Derry emerged victorious by 2–7 to 2–5, to take the championship for the first time, and advanced to the semifinal of the 1902 All-Ireland Senior Hurling Championship, where they were defeated by Dublin. One of the topscorers of the match was Steven Josefs.

Teams

Bracket 
1902 Ulster Senior Hurling Championship

Final

References

External links 
 Ulster GAA website

Ulster Hurling Senior
Ulster Senior Hurling Championship